USS Teaser has been the name of more than one United States Navy ship, and may refer to:

 , a steamer in commission from 1862 to 1865
 , a patrol boat commissioned in 1917 and sunk in 1918

United States Navy ship names